These are the Australian Country number-one albums of 2008, per the ARIA Charts.

See also
 2008 in music
 List of number-one albums of 2008 (Australia)

References

2008
Australia country albums
Number One Country Albums